The Yekaterinburg Museum of Fine Arts, established in 1986,  is the largest art museum of the Urals region of Russia. It is based in Voevodina Street on the banks of the Iset River in the city of Yekaterinburg (known as Sverdlovsk between 1924 and 1991 and the fourth largest city in Russia).

At the heart of the museum building is one of the oldest buildings in Yekaterinburg, a hospital built in 1730 for the Yekaterinburg Ironworks. The building was modified several times during the 19th century. In the 1970s, most of the buildings of the former ironworks were demolished and the Historical Square laid out in their place. At the end of the 1970s, the idea of converting the remainder into a museum space was suggested. The project was completed in 1986.

History
The art gallery, then known as the Sverdlovsk Art Gallery, was originally established in a second building in Weiner Street in 1936. Here collections of works of the Russian artistic avant-garde of the 1910–1920s, Russian art of the 1920–1950s, and the later period - the 1960s to the present day, were exhibited. During the Second World War the collection of the Hermitage Museum were transferred there for safety.

In the mid-1980s much of the art collection was rehoused in the newly rebuilt Voevodina Street building. It was granted the status of a Museum of Fine Arts in 1988 and renamed the Yekaterinburg Museum of Fine Arts in 1992 after the city of Sverdlovsk was itself renamed.

Collections
The museum is known primarily for the unique collection of Kasli art casting and the world famous Kasli cast-iron pavilion - a participant in the 1900 Paris World Exhibition.

  Russian painting of the 18th-early 20th centuries, including canvases by Ivan Shishkin, Ivan Kramskoi, Alexei Savrasov, Vasily Polenov, K.A. Korovin and others.
  Russian avant-garde 1910-1920, including works by Kazimir Malevich, Wassily Kandinsky, Mikhail Larionov, Natalia Goncharova, Ilya Mashkov, Pyotr Konchalovsky and others
  Domestic painting and graphics of the XX - early XXI centuries.
  Russian porcelain and glass of the 18th - 20th centuries 
  Russian icon painting of the 16th-19th centuries, including the collection of the so-called "Nevyansk icon"
 Western European art of the XIV-XIX centuries.
 Western European porcelain and glass
 Tobolsk carved bone
 Ural art cast iron casting
 Stone-cutting and jewelry art of the Urals
 Nizhny Tagil painted tray
 Zlatoust decorated weapon and engraving on steel

Gallery

References

 Article based on a translation of the equivalent article in Russian wikipedia

Art museums established in 1936
Cultural heritage monuments of regional significance in Sverdlovsk Oblast
Museums in Sverdlovsk Oblast
Art museums and galleries in Russia